The term jump seat may refer to:

Jump seat in aircraft
Jumpseat (satellite)
Jumping position, or two-point position in hunt seat English-style horse riding